Patrick Holt (31 January 1912 – 12 October 1993) was an English film and television actor.

Biography
Born Patrick Parsons in Cheltenham, Gloucestershire, Holt spent some of his childhood in India with his uncle, after which he was sent to Christ's Hospital, a famous charity school in Britain. Here he formed a close friendship with a boy in the same boarding house, the future film star Michael Wilding.

He started his acting career in repertory theatres, and in 1939, landed a leading part on the London stage, as well as minor roles in films such as The Return of the Frog (1938) but his career was interrupted when the Second World War broke out and he joined the army. His army service saw him in Burma, Singapore and India, often on secret missions behind enemy lines, and he rose to the rank of lieutenant colonel.

Career
After the war he joined the J. Arthur Rank charm school and after supporting roles in films such as Hungry Hill, Frieda and The October Man (all 1947), steadily established himself as a lead actor in films of the late 1940s, including The Mark of Cain (1947), My Sister and I (1948), Marry Me and A Boy, a Girl and a Bike (both 1949).

His leading man status in prestige films was brief and he found himself as the star of 'B' movies during the fifties and early sixties, with the film writer David Quinlan calling him "the Dennis Price of the B film", although something of a misnomer as the actors were not alike, Holt playing a wider variety of character types. These second features included Guilt Is My Shadow (1950), Stolen Assignment (1955), Miss Tulip Stays the Night (1955) and Suspended Alibi (1957), with his final lead roles coming in the 1962 films Serena, Flight from Singapore and Night of the Prowler. During this period he also took on supporting roles in bigger budget movies such as Ivanhoe (1952) and I Was Monty's Double (1958). He also appeared on stage during the decade and in 1953 co-starred with Anna Neagle in the musical The Glorious Days in the West End.

He was one of many leading men and women of the 1950s who struggled to maintain their status as leads beyond the early 1960s. However, by evolving into a character actor, he sustained his career into old age, working on stage and television as well as in the cinema, and he was still listed in the Spotlight casting directory at the time of his death. Later film appearances include Guns at Batasi (1964), Thunderball (1965), Young Winston (1972) and The Wild Geese (1978), while television included The Avengers, The Saint, Dixon of Dock Green, Armchair Theatre, Crown Court, Shabby Tiger, Survivors, Poldark and Emmerdale.

Personal life
His first wife was the actress Sonia Holm. In 1954, he married Sandra Dorne, with whom he had occasionally co-starred.

Selected filmography

 The Challenge (1938) - Minor Role (uncredited)
 The Return of the Frog (1938) - Cadet with Question (uncredited)
 Sword of Honour  (1939) - Lord Talmadge
 Convoy (1940) - Holt (uncredited)
 Hungry Hill (1947) - Ward 
 Frieda (1947) - Alan 
 The October Man (1947) - Harry Carden
 Master of Bankdam (1947) - Lemuel Pickersgill
 When the Bough Breaks (1947) - Robert Norman
 The Mark of Cain (1947) - John Howard
 My Sister and I (1948) - Roger Crisp
 Portrait from Life (1948) - Ferguson
 A Boy, a Girl and a Bike (1949) - Sam Walters
 Marry Me! (1949) - Martin Roberts
 Boys in Brown (1949) - Tigson
 Guilt Is My Shadow (1950) - Kit
 The Magic Box (1951) - Sitter in Bath Studio
 13 East Street (1952) - Inspector Gerald Blake
 Come Back Peter (1952) - John Neilson
 Ivanhoe (1952) - Philip DeMalvoisin
 Circumstantial Evidence (1952) - Michael Carteret
 John Wesley (1954) - Thomas Maxfield
 A Stranger Came Home (1954) - Job Crandall
 The Golden Link (1954) - Terry Maguire
 The Men of Sherwood Forest (1954) - King Richard
 The Dark Avenger (1955) - Sir Ellys
 Miss Tulip Stays the Night (1955) - Andrew Dax
 Stolen Assignment (1955) - Henry Crossley
 Alias John Preston (1955) - Sylvia's Husband in Dream
 The Gelignite Gang (1956) - John Rutherford
 The Girl in the Picture (1957) - Inspector Bliss
 Operation Murder (1957) - Dr. Bowen
 Suspended Alibi (1957) - Paul Pearson
 There's Always a Thursday (1957) - Middleton
 Fortune Is a Woman (1957) - Fred Connor
 I Was Monty's Double (1958) - Col. Dawson
 Further Up the Creek (1958) - First Lieutenant (uncredited)
 Too Hot to Handle (1960) - Inspector West
 The Challenge (1960) - Max
 Dentist on the Job (1961) - Newsreader
 The Frightened City (1961) - Supt. Dave Carter
 Serena (1962) - Inspector Gregory  
 Flight from Singapore (1962) - Squadron Leader Hill
 Night of the Prowler (1962) - Robert Langton
 Girl in the Headlines (1963) - Walbrook
 Guns at Batasi (1964) - Captain
 Genghis Khan (1965) - Kuchluk
 Thunderball (1965) - Group Captain Dawson (uncredited)
 The Fighting Prince of Donegal (1966)
 The Vulture (1967) - Jarvis, the butler
 Hammerhead (1968) - Huntzinger
 The Desperados (1969) - Haller
 The Magic Christian (1969) - Duke in Sotheby's
 Cromwell (1970) - Captain Lundsford
 No Blade of Grass (1970) - David Custance
 When Dinosaurs Ruled the Earth (1970) - Ammon
 Young Winston (1972) - Colonel Martin
 Psychomania (1973) - Sergeant
 Diamonds on Wheels (1974) - Steward
 The Amorous Milkman (1975) - Tom
 Legend of the Werewolf (1975) - Dignitary
 Let's Get Laid (1978) - The Commissioner
 The Wild Geese (1978) - Skyjacker
 The Sea Wolves (1980) - Barker
 Priest of Love (1981) - Arthur Lawrence
 The Whistle Blower (1987) - Irate Driver
 Playing Away (1987) - The Colonel
 Strike It Rich (1990) - Lecherous Man with Wink (final film role)

References

External links
 

1912 births
1993 deaths
English male film actors
English male television actors
People from Cheltenham
Male actors from Gloucestershire
20th-century English male actors
People educated at Christ's Hospital
British people in colonial India
British Army personnel of World War II
British Army officers